Zhirayr Agavelyan  (born December 8, 1955, Yerevan), is an Armenian TV director, artist, actor, writer, TV scenarist, musician, and member of Artists’ Union of Armenia (2015).

Biography 
Zhirayr Agavelyan was born in 1955 in Yerevan, Armenia.  In 1972 he graduated  from Hagop Baronian school  #59 in  Yerevan.   1973-1977 studied and graduated from Echmiadzin college  TV department  in  Armenia. 1975-1977 served in the army (Germany) .  1977- 1980 graduated from  "Armenfilm" studio, with the qualification  of actor  for TV and theatre.  1977-1991 he worked as a TV director in the Armenian Public TV/1TV in Yerevan. 1984-1989 studied and graduated from St. Petersburg Culture Institute TV department  in Russia.  In 1991 left for United States of America. In 2012 he returned  Armenia.

He began working  with photo art in 2009. He has had many exhibitions not only in the homeland, but also abroad.

Books 
He has published three books: "Take Me in Your Hands" (published by Gasprint Publishing House, 2012), "Miniatures of thought" (philosophical  aphorisms, Yerevan Author Publishing House, 2013), "Three ages" autobiographical novel with photo art pictures (Lusakn Publishing House, 2015).

Photo directing-photo art gallery

Book cover illustrations

Shots from exhibitions

Newspaper articles

Article-interviews

References 

1955 births
Living people
Armenian directors
21st-century Armenian actors
21st-century Armenian painters
21st-century Armenian writers
21st-century Armenian screenwriters